The Budapest Business Journal or BBJ is a biweekly business magazine published in Hungary. It is the largest, oldest and a leading publication in its category in the country.

History and profile
The BBJ was launched in November 1992 as a weekly. The magazine, based in Budapest, was converted into biweekly later. It was founded by a US-owned company headed by Stephen A. O'Connor, an American media entrepreneur. Mike Stone was also its founder.  

The publisher is Absolut Media Kft. It was originally published by  New World Publishing  which also published the Warsaw Business Journal in Poland and the Prague Business Journal in Czechoslovakia (and later the Czech Republic) until January 2004. 

As its title implies, the BBJ exclusively focuses on business news and related analysis, targeting business professionals. In addition, it provides detailed industry and company information. The magazine publishes rankings of Hungarian companies each year in a separate publication called The Book of Lists. 

The BBJ was one of the independent publications and provided investigative reports in the late 1990s. In 2002 the BBJ had a circulation of 8,700 copies.

The BBJ has a website which is one of the leading business information websites in the country. As of 15 May 2013 the Alexa rank of the website was 858437.

See also
 List of magazines in Hungary

References

External links
 

1992 establishments in Hungary
Biweekly magazines
Business magazines
English-language magazines
English-language press in Hungary
Magazines established in 1992
Magazines published in Budapest
Weekly magazines published in Hungary